SolarAid is an international development charity which is working to create a sustainable market for solar lights in Africa. In line with the Sustainable Development Goal 7: "Ensure access to affordable, reliable, sustainable and modern energy for all", the organisation's aim is to reduce global poverty and climate change through providing access to solar lights for rural communities. SolarAid wholly owns the social enterprise, SunnyMoney, the largest seller of solar lights in Africa. SolarAid was founded by Solarcentury, a solar energy company based in the UK.

Aims and focus
SolarAid aims to light up every home, school and clinic in Africa by 2030, using safe, clean, solar power. The charity's social enterprise, SunnyMoney, operates in Zambia and Malawi. SolarAid also work through partners in Uganda and Senegal in West Africa.

Awards
SolarAid is the recipient of a 2013 Google Global Impact Award, a 2013 Guardian Sustainable Business Award. and the 2013 Ashden Gold Award.

See also
Renewable energy in developing countries
Solar lamp
UN-Energy

References

External links
SolarAid Official website
SunnyMoney Official website

Charities based in London
Development charities based in the United Kingdom
International development in Africa
International organisations based in London
International sustainable development
Renewable energy policy
Sustainability organizations